Oliver "Ollie" Opeda Ongtawco (born June 25, 1941; died June 8, 2020) was a Filipino bowler who represented the Philippines in international tournaments from the 1970s to the 1980s. He was the gold medalist of the men's single event of the 1979 FIQ WTBA World Tenpin Bowling Championships held at the Celebrity Sports Plaza in Quezon City out-besting Rogelio Felice of Venezuela.  He also clinched the silver medal in the 1983 edition of the same event in Caracas, Venezuela in the trio event with Paeng Nepomuceno and Rauel Reformado and was also a participant of 1975 World Cup in Makati.

He was named 1979 Philippine Sportswriters Association Bowler of the Year.

Ongtawco studied at the Colegio de San Juan de Letran.

He died on June 8, 2020, at age 78 due to a heart attack.

Coaching career
Ollie served as national team coach. He received government incentives both as player and coach.

References

Filipino ten-pin bowling players
1941 births
2020 deaths
Colegio de San Juan de Letran alumni
Southeast Asian Games silver medalists for the Philippines
Southeast Asian Games medalists in bowling
Competitors at the 1983 Southeast Asian Games